Les Coeurs brûlés "Burned Hearts", is a French miniseries in eight 90-minute episodes, produced by Jean Sagols a screenplay by Jean-Pierre Jaubert, Silbert Queen, and Jean-Charles Dudrumet. It was broadcast from 3 July 1992 to 21 August 1992 on TF1.

Synopsis
Isa Mercier, a cashier in a supermarket is determined to leave her situation. Thanks to her uncle, she was hired as a maid at "La Réserve", one of the most beautiful palaces on the French Riviera, where Hélène Charrière reigns over the hotel.

Cast 
Mireille Darc : Hélène Charrière
Amélie Pick : Isa Mercier puis Leroy
Pierre Cosso : Christian Leroy
Danièle Évenou : Geneviève Mercier
Michel Duchaussoy : Arnaud Charrière
Alain Doutey : Jean-Philippe Vernier
Magali Noel : Julia Bertyl
Jacques Serres : Marcel Mercier
Pierre Vaneck : Marc Leroy
Josy Bernard : Patricia Leroy
Patrice-Flora Praxo : Audrey Bertyl
Frédéric Deban : Sylvain Roquière
Rémy Roggero : Tanguy Mercier
Dora Doll : Marie-Thérèse Fromentin
Michel Robbe : Stéphane Romanski
Cyril Aubin : Tonin

Episodes
 La Blessure The injury
 Le Court-circuit The short circuit
 L'Ambition Ambition
 La Cassure The Break
 Lutte d'intérêts Fighting interests
 Quitte ou double Double or quits
 Anges et démons Angels and Demons
 L'Amour triomphant Triumphant love

Comments
Broadcast on TF1 in the summer of 1992, this soap opera was seen by around 10 million spectators every Friday.
Its credits are interpreted by Nicole Croisille.
The success of this series spawned a sequel in 1994: Les Yeux d'Hélène.
In September 2017, following the death of Mireille Darc, the Série Club channel rebroadcast the series.

References

External links 
 
 
 Générique "Les Cœurs Brûlés"

1990s French television miniseries
1992 French television series debuts
1992 French television series endings
Incest in film